MV Bigga is a ro-ro passenger and car ferry that operates on the Bluemull sound service, operated by SIC Ferries. She is the sister ship of [[MV Geira|MV Geira']].

HistoryBigga operated on the Yell Sound route between 1991 and 2004 when she then transferred to the Bluemull Sound route.

LayoutBigga'' has a total of 3 Lane spaces on her car deck. Like most SIC Ferries her size, she has a passenger lounge located beneath the car deck.

References

1991 ships
Transport in Shetland